Walter Stone Tevis (February 28, 1928 – August 9, 1984) was an American novelist and short story writer. Three of his six novels were adapted into major films: The Hustler, The Color of Money and The Man Who Fell to Earth. A fourth, The Queen’s Gambit, was adapted into a miniseries with the same title and shown on Netflix in 2020. His books have been translated into at least 18 languages.

Life and career
Tevis was born in San Francisco, California, in 1928 to Anna Elizabeth "Betty" (née Bacon) and Walter Stone Tevis, an appraiser, growing up in the Sunset District, across the street from Golden Gate Park. His sister, Betty, was born in 1925.

He developed a rheumatic heart condition, so his parents placed him in the Stanford Children's Convalescent home (and given heavy doses of phenobarbital), for a year, during which time they returned to Kentucky, where the Tevis family had been given an early land grant in Madison County. Walter traveled across country alone by train at age 11 to rejoin his family in Kentucky. He made friends with Toby Kavanaugh, a fellow high school student, and learned to shoot pool in the Kavanaugh mansion in Lawrenceburg. In the library there, he read science fiction for the first time. They remained lifelong friends. Kavanaugh later became the owner of a pool room in Lexington, which would have an impact on Tevis's writing.

Near the end of World War II, the 17-year-old Tevis served in the Pacific Theater as a Navy carpenter's mate on board the USS Hamilton.

After his discharge, he graduated from Model Laboratory School in 1945. He entered the University of Kentucky, where he received B.A. (1949) and M.A. (1954) degrees in English literature and studied with A. B. Guthrie Jr., the author of The Big Sky. While a student there, Tevis worked in a pool hall and published a story about pool written for Guthrie's class. He later attended the Iowa Writers' Workshop, where he received an MFA in creative writing in 1960.

After graduation, Tevis wrote for the Kentucky Highway Department. He taught classes in fields from the sciences and English to physical education in small-town Kentucky high schools in Science Hill, Hawesville, Irvine, and Carlisle. He also taught at Northern Kentucky University, the University of Kentucky, and Southern Connecticut State University.

Tevis taught English literature and creative writing at Ohio University in Athens, Ohio, from 1965 to 1978, where he was named University Professor. Tevis was a member of the Authors Guild.

Career

Short stories
Tevis wrote more than two dozen short stories for a variety of magazines. "The Big Hustle," his pool hall story for Collier's (August 5, 1955), was illustrated by Denver Gillen. It was followed by short stories in The American Magazine, Bluebook, Cosmopolitan, Esquire, Galaxy Science Fiction, Playboy, Redbook and The Saturday Evening Post.

Novels
His first novel, The Hustler, was published by Harper & Row in 1959. Tevis followed it with The Man Who Fell to Earth, published in 1963. Tevis drew from elements of his childhood in The Man Who Fell to Earth, as noted by James Sallis, writing in The Boston Globe:

During his time teaching at Ohio University, Tevis became aware that the level of literacy among students was falling at an alarming rate. That observation gave him the idea for Mockingbird (1980), set in a grim and decaying New York City in the 25th century. The population is declining, no one can read, and robots rule over the drugged, illiterate humans. With the birth rate dropping, the end of the species seems a possibility. Tevis was a nominee for the Nebula Award for Best Novel in 1980 for Mockingbird. During one of his last televised interviews, he revealed that PBS once planned a production of Mockingbird as a follow-up to their 1979 film of Ursula K. Le Guin's The Lathe of Heaven.

Tevis also wrote The Steps of the Sun (1983), The Queen's Gambit (1983), and The Color of Money (1984), a sequel to The Hustler. His short stories were collected in Far from Home in 1981.

Adaptations
Three of Tevis's six novels were adapted for major motion pictures, and one for a TV mini-series. The Hustler, directed by Robert Rossen, and The Color of Money, directed by Martin Scorsese, followed the escapades of fictional pool hustler "Fast Eddie" Felson. The Man Who Fell to Earth, directed by Nicolas Roeg, was released in 1976; it was subsequently re-made in 1987 as a TV film. The Queen’s Gambit is a 2020 Netflix mini-series starring Anya Taylor-Joy.

Personal life
Tevis married Jamie Griggs in 1957, and they remained together for over twenty years before getting divorced. They had two children, a son, William Thomas, and daughter, Julia Ann.

Tevis was a frequent smoker, gambler and alcoholic, and his works often included these vices as central themes. Tevis took some of the money he earned from the movie rights to The Hustler and moved his family to Mexico, where he later claimed that he "stayed drunk for eight months." When Tevis was drinking, he couldn't write. According to his son Will, "[Walter Tevis] is the [anti-]hero of all his own books." Having a heart condition, Tevis was given phenobarbital at a young age. This is considered part of the inspiration for the character Beth Harmon in The Queen's Gambit, and according to Tevis, part of the reason for his later alcoholism. Tevis was able to overcome his alcohol habit in the 1970s with help from Alcoholics Anonymous.

Tevis spent his last years in New York City as a full-time writer, where he died of lung cancer in 1984. He was buried in Richmond, Kentucky.

In 2003, Jamie Griggs Tevis published her autobiography, My Life with the Hustler. She died August 4, 2006.

In 1983, Tevis married Eleanora Walker, later the trustee of the Walter Tevis Copyright Trust. She died December 9, 2016, at Bellevue Hospital in New York City, in an apparent suicide. Walter Tevis's literary output is represented by the Susan Schulman Literary Agency.

Bibliography

Novels
 
  Reprint: Del Rey Impact, 1999.
  Reprint: Del Rey Impact, 1999.

Short fiction
 Collections
 Far from Home, Doubleday, 1981

 List of stories
 "The Best in the Country", Esquire, November 1954.
 "The Big Hustle", Collier's, August 5, 1955.
 "Misleading Lady", The American Magazine, October 1955.
 "Mother of the Artist", Everywoman's, 1955.
 "The Man from Chicago", Bluebook, January 1956.
 "The Stubbornest Man", Saturday Evening Post, January 19, 1957.
 "The Hustler", (original title: "The Actors") Playboy
 "Operation Gold Brick" (original title: "The Goldbrick"), If, June, 1957.
 "The Ifth of Oofth", Galaxy, April 1957
 "The Big Bounce", Galaxy, February 1958.
 "Sucker's Game", Redbook, August 1958.
 "First Love", Redbook, August 1958.
 "Far From Home", The Magazine of Fantasy & Science Fiction, December 1958.
 "Alien Love" (original title: "The Man from Budapest") Cosmopolitan, April 1959. Adapted as a teleplay for NBC's The Loretta Young Show, season 7, episode 12, aired December 13, 1959.                
 "A Short Ride in the Dark", Toronto Star Weekly Magazine, April 4, 1959.
 "Gentle Is the Gunman" Saturday Evening Post, August 13, 1960.
 "The Other End of the Line", The Magazine of Fantasy & Science Fiction, November 1961.
 "The Machine That Hustled Pool", Nugget, February 1961.
 "The Scholar's Disciple", College English, October 1969.
 "The King Is Dead", Playboy, September 1973.
 "Rent Control", Omni, October 1979.
 "The Apotheosis of Myra", Playboy, July 1980.
 "Echo" The Magazine of Fantasy & Science Fiction, October 1980.
 "Out of Luck", Omni, November 1980.
 "Sitting in Limbo", Far from Home, 1981.
 "Daddy", Far from Home, 1981.
 "A Visit from Mother", Far from Home, 1981.

Critical studies and reviews of Tevis's work
 
 Ifkovic, Ed. "The Hustler", in Talking of Michelangelo: 20 Memories. Createspace 2014, pp. 1–9.

References

External links

 
 
 
 
 
 

1928 births
1984 deaths
20th-century American male writers
20th-century American novelists
American male novelists
American psychological fiction writers
American science fiction writers
Deaths from lung cancer in New York (state)
Novelists from Kentucky
Novelists from Ohio
Ohio University alumni
Ohio University faculty
Pool writers and broadcasters
United States Navy personnel of World War II
United States Navy sailors
Writers from San Francisco